Avishai Dekel (born 1951) is a professor of physics at the Hebrew University of Jerusalem, Israel, holding the Andre Aisenstadt Chair of Theoretical Physics. His primary research interests are in astrophysics and cosmology.

Academic career
Dekel earned his Ph.D. from the Hebrew University in 1980, and was a research fellow at Caltech and assistant professor at Yale University before joining the faculty of the Hebrew University in 1986. 

He served as the Head of The Racah Institute of Physics (1997–2001), the Dean of the Authority for the Community and Youth at the Hebrew University (2005–2011), and the President of the Israel Physical Society (2008–11). He headed the university computing committee, was a member of the executive committee of the board of trustees and a member of the standing committee of the Hebrew University. 

Dekel was awarded a Visiting Miller Professorship at UC Berkeley, a Blaise Pascal International Chair of Research by the École Normale Supérieure in Paris (2004–06), and a Lagrange fellowship in IAP Paris (2015–16).  He has been elected as a fellow of the Israel Physical Society (2019), and has been awarded the Landau Prize for Arts and Sciences (2020).

Dekel is known for his contributions to research in cosmology, especially the study of the formation of galaxies and large-scale structure in the Universe, which is dominated by dark energy and dark matter.

His expertise is dwarf galaxies and supernova feedback (1986, 2003), large-scale cosmic flows and early estimates of fundamental cosmological parameters (1989-2001),

the structure of dark-matter galactic halos (2000–2003), and  the theory of galaxy formation (2003–2012).

His research focuses on galaxy formation in its most active phase at the early universe, using analytic models and computer simulations. He studies how continuous streams of cold gas and merging galaxies from the cosmic web lead to star-forming disks and drive violent gravitational disk instability, and how this instability leads to the formation of compact spheroidal galactic components with central massive black holes.

Dekel is the most highly cited astrophysicist in Israel, with 45,000 citations and H-index 106.

References

External links
Scholarly Works by Avishai Dekel from the Astrophysical Data System

1951 births
Living people
Israeli Jews
Academic staff of the Hebrew University of Jerusalem
Israeli astronomers
Cosmologists
Israeli physicists
Israeli astrophysicists
Jewish physicists
California Institute of Technology fellows